Yuriy Kozhanov (born 5 January 1990) is a Kazakh professional basketball player, currently with Legion Alma-Ata of the Kazakhstan Basketball Championship.

He represented Kazakhstan's national basketball team at the 2016 FIBA Asia Challenge in Tehran, Iran.

References

External links
 FIBA profile
 FIBA profile (2009 FIBA Under-19 World Championship)
 Asia-basket.com profile

1990 births
Living people
Guards (basketball)
Forwards (basketball)
Kazakhstani men's basketball players
People from Almaty Region